Ramón Maximiliano Velazco (born 8 March 1995) is an Argentine professional footballer who plays as a goalkeeper for Cobreloa.

Career
Velazco's first club was Argentine Primera División side River Plate, he played in the youth ranks for nine years. He appeared on the substitutes bench fifteen times in all competitions during the 2016 and 2016–17 seasons, prior to making his professional debut on 25 May 2017 in River Plate's final Group 3 match in the 2017 Copa Libertadores versus Independiente Medellín. In August 2017, Velazco joined Arsenal de Sarandí on loan. After being an unused substitute twenty-two times, his first league appearance arrived on 14 April 2018 versus Belgrano; one of two matches for them.

A loan to Defensores de Belgrano followed. Having featured in twenty-four games for Defensores de Belgrano in 2018–19, his loan with them was extended on 20 June 2019. He returned to River at the end of the year, prior to securing a loan move to Primera B de Chile with Cobreloa in January 2020. His debut arrived on 13 January in the preceding campaign's promotion play-offs, delayed from the end of 2019, as his new side lost to Deportes Temuco at the first hurdle. He appeared twenty-six times in 2020, which preceded Cobreloa signing Velazco permanently; penning a four-year contract.

Career statistics
.

Honours
River Plate
Dallas Cup: 2014
Weifang Cup: 2014

References

External links

1995 births
Living people
Sportspeople from Santa Fe Province
Argentine footballers
Association football goalkeepers
Argentine expatriate footballers
Expatriate footballers in Chile
Argentine expatriate sportspeople in Chile
Argentine Primera División players
Primera Nacional players
Primera B de Chile players
Club Atlético River Plate footballers
Arsenal de Sarandí footballers
Defensores de Belgrano footballers
Cobreloa footballers